The National Theatre of Iceland (NTI) (pronounced ) in Reykjavík, is the national theatre of Iceland. 
The theater, designed by Guðjón Samúelsson, was formally opened on 20 April 1950. Since 2020, the artistic director of The National Theatre is Magnús Geir Þórðarsson.

Productions
The NTI performs around thirty productions each season (new productions, re-premieres, co-productions and guest performances), comprising a varied repertoire of new Icelandic works, new foreign works, Icelandic and foreign classics, musicals, dance pieces, puppet theatre and children's productions. The theatre produces around twenty new productions each year, and also collaborates with independent theatre and dance groups. The theatre serves an important role in the development of new Icelandic plays, and aims to develop youngsters' appreciation of the theatre through productions especially intended for children and youth, and special visits to the theatre.

Touring Productions
The NTI often tours its productions around Iceland, and many productions have also toured abroad, among them Tragedy at the Worlds Stages, Kennedy Center, Gerpla at The Bergen International Festival, Shimmer the Silver Fish at international children festivals in Sweden and Russia, The Sea Museum at the Centre Dramatique National d’Orléans and Peer Gynt at the Ibsen Festival in Oslo, Barbican Centre in London and Centre for Fine Arts in Brussels.

Ensemble and production
The NTI is an ensemble theatre with around 35 actors employed on a permanent basis, and also works with actors with temporary assignments. The theatre runs its own efficient production departments that manufacture sets, costumes and wigs, as well as productive sound and lighting departments. A normal rehearsal period is eight weeks, the last four weeks on stage. The theatre works closely with schools on all education levels.

International collaboration
The NTI collaborates internationally, notably with renowned directors and designers. Among international directors who have recently enriched the Icelandic theatre scene are Yaël Farber (My Brilliant Friend 2021), Benedict Andrews (Macbeth 2013, King Lear 2010), Stefan Metz (Tartuffe 2019, View from the Bridge 2016, Eyvindur and Halla 2015, The Crucible 2014, The Caucasian Chalk Circle 1999) and Rimas Tuminas (The Seagull 1993, Don Juan 1995, Three Sisters 1997, The Cherry Orchard 2000, Richard III 2003). Other collaborations are under way.

Icelandic directors that work closely with the NTI have also gained international prestige, as theatre and film directors, among them Baltasar Kormákur (Adrift, Everest), Benedikt Erlingsson (Nordic Council Film Prize for Of Horses and Men and Woman at War), Una Þorleifsdóttir (Theatr im. Stefana Zeromskiego w Kielcach), Gísli Örn Garðarsson (Young Vic, Lyric Theatre, Royal Shakespeare Company, American Repertory Theater) and Thorleifur Örn Arnarsson (Volksbühne, Schauspiel Hannover).

Stages
The NTI is situated in downtown Reykjavík. Today the theatre performs in five separate venues: the Main Stage (Stóra sviðið, 500 seats), the Black Box (Kassinn, 130 seats), the Small Stage for Children (Kúlan, 80 seats), the experimental space the Attic (Loftið, 70 seats) and The Theatre Cellar Cabaret Club (Leikhúskjallarinn, 100-120 seats). The theatre offers a variety of refreshments for guests. A little theatre book shop is run in the foyer.

A diversity strategy for the years ahead

It is the shared ambition of the NTI's staff that the work ethics at the theatre shall be outstanding. The employee team has a vision of a collective approach in the making of theatre, and makes every endeavor for a friendly and encouraging atmosphere in the workplace. The NTI strives for upholding equality and cultivating diversity among its staff and audiences, and in its artistic objectives. Gender equality is at the heart of the personnel policy. The theatre has an official gender equality plan and received an official Equal Pay certification in 2020. The National theatre is working on a diversity strategy for the years ahead. In 2018 a Pact of Communication was co-created by the NTI staff and now serves as a communal code of conduct within the workplace.

Artistic Directors of The National Theatre

References

External links 
 

Iceland, National Theatre of Iceland
Theatres in Iceland
Theatre in Iceland